Dirk Jeffrey Koetter (born February 5, 1959) is an American football coach who is currently serving as the interim offensive coordinator at Boise State University. He was the head coach of the Tampa Bay Buccaneers of the National Football League (NFL) from 2016 to 2018. Koetter was the offensive coordinator for the Jacksonville Jaguars, Atlanta Falcons, and Buccaneers.

Early years
Koetter grew up in Pocatello, Idaho, the son of Jim Koetter, a German American football coach. A quarterback, he graduated from Highland High School in 1977 and stayed in town to play college football at Idaho State University, receiving a bachelor's degree in 1981 and a master's in athletic administration in 1982.

Coaching career

High school and college coaching
Koetter was the head coach at Highland High School for two seasons (1983, 1984), then became a full-time college assistant coach in 1985 as the offensive coordinator at San Francisco State University. After his time at San Francisco State, he coached at UTEP (1986–1988), Missouri (1989–1993), Boston College (1994–1995), and Oregon (1996–1997). 

Koetter was the head coach for three seasons at Boise State from 1998 to 2000, then moved to Arizona State in 2001. His record with the Broncos was 26–10, with two Big West Conference titles and two bowl victories and was named Big West Coach of the Year twice. At Arizona State, Koetter compiled a 40–34 record, and four Bowl appearances in six years. Under Koetter, who was also the offensive play caller, the Sun Devils became known for a vertical passing attack. On November 26, 2006, The Arizona Republic reported that Koetter was being terminated as Arizona State football coach. His final game was the 2006 Hawaii Bowl on Christmas Eve, a 41–24 loss. 

On June 15, 2022, it was announced that Koetter will return to Boise State as an offensive analyst.

Jacksonville Jaguars
In 2007, Koetter accepted the position of offensive coordinator for the Jacksonville Jaguars of the National Football League (NFL). In his first year in the NFL, he had immediate success setting franchise records for total points scored and yards gained while helping the Jaguars to an 11–5 record. In his five seasons with the Jaguars, the team cumulatively ranked third in the NFL in rushing yards over that time span in addition to having the NFL's leading rusher in Maurice Jones-Drew in 2010.

Atlanta Falcons
On January 15, 2012, Koetter was hired as the offensive coordinator for the Atlanta Falcons. On January 2, 2013, the Falcons signed Koetter to a contract extension that ran through the 2014 season. Koetter and the Falcons appeared in the NFC Championship Game in 2013 but lost 24-28 to the San Francisco 49ers, who had made their first Super Bowl in 18 years.

Tampa Bay Buccaneers
Koetter was hired by the Falcons' division rival Tampa Bay Buccaneers to become their offensive coordinator in 2015. After the firing of Lovie Smith, Koetter was hired on January 15, 2016 as the head coach. After posting a 9–7 record in 2016 and barely missing the playoffs, the Buccaneers had high expectations for the 2017 campaign. However, Koetter and the Buccaneers failed to meet those expectations, slipping to a 5–11 record. Despite regressing in his second year as the Buccaneers coach, the Buccaneers announced they would retain Koetter for the 2018 season on December 29, 2017. After another 5–11 season, the Buccaneers fired Koetter on December 30, 2018.

Atlanta Falcons (second stint)
On January 8, 2019, Koetter was re-hired as the offensive coordinator for the Atlanta Falcons. He announced his retirement from coaching following the 2020 NFL season on January 22, 2021.

Boise State University
On June 15, 2022, Koetter was hired to be an offensive analyst at Boise State University.On September 24, 2022, head coach Andy Avalos fired offensive coordinator Tim Plough and named Koetter the interim offensive coordinator for the rest of the 2022 season.

Head coaching record

College

NFL

References

1959 births
Living people
American football quarterbacks
Arizona State Sun Devils football coaches
Atlanta Falcons coaches
Boise State Broncos football coaches
Boston College Eagles football coaches
High school football coaches in Idaho
Idaho State Bengals football players
Idaho State University alumni
Jacksonville Jaguars coaches
Missouri Tigers football coaches
National Football League offensive coordinators
Oregon Ducks football coaches
Tampa Bay Buccaneers coaches
Tampa Bay Buccaneers head coaches
UTEP Miners football coaches
Sportspeople from Pocatello, Idaho
Coaches of American football from Idaho
Players of American football from Idaho
American people of German descent